Anhanguera is a district within the subprefecture of Perus in São Paulo, Brazil.

References

Districts of São Paulo